Carlo Rossetti (1876–1948) was the second Italian consul to Korea, serving from November 1902 to May 1903. Before being posted to the consulate in Seoul, he was a lieutenant in the Italian Royal Navy. While in Korea, he took photographs of Korean people in various capacities, the first such produced by a Westerner according to Lucio Izzo, director of the Italian Cultural Institute. Upon his return to Italy in 1904, he wrote and talked about his time in Korea.

Publications by Rossetti
 Corea e coreani : impressioni e ricerche sull'impero del Gran Han. Bergamo : Istituto d'arti grafiche, 1904-1905
 Lettere dalla Corea : Cenni sulle istituzioni ed i commerci di quell'impero / Canavis (Carlo Rossetti) Livorno : R. Giusti, 1904

References

External links
 Selected photographs:  http://anthony.sogang.ac.kr/Rossetti/photos.htm
 http://ideas0419.tistory.com/

1876 births
1948 deaths
20th-century Italian writers
20th-century Italian male writers
20th-century diplomats
1900s in Korea
Expatriates from Italy in Korea